Shri G.C. Malhotra (born 24 July 1943) is the former Secretary General of 12th Lok Sabha  and 13th Lok Sabha and Lok Sabha Secretariat, Parliament of India, i.e. the House of the People (Lower House) in the Indian Parliament. As Secretary General, he is also the Administrative head of the Secretariat of the Lok Sabha. The post of Secretary General is of the rank of the Cabinet Secretary in the Government of India, who is the senior most civil servant to the Indian Government.

Career and positions held
Mr. Malhotra holds M.A and LL.M degrees and joined the Lok Sabha Secretariat in 1970 and served in various capacities and became Secretary-General of Lok Sabha and Lok Sabha Secretariat on 14 July 1999. He was also secretary-general, India Parliamentary Group; secretary, India Branch of C.P.A.; secretary-general, National Group of I.P.U; secretary-general, Asia Region of C.P.A.

Book published and literary activities
 Motions of Confidence and No - Confidence
 Co-editor, Delhi Metropolitan Council: A Study, 1966–89
 Associate editor, Netaji and INA
 Constitution Amendment in India
and was editor of various periodicals and departmental publications of Lok Sabha Secretariat.

References

1943 births
Living people
13th Lok Sabha
Indian civil servants
Secretaries General of the Lok Sabha